Zbigniew Kwaśniewski (2 April 1948 – 29 June 2017) was a Polish footballer. He played in two matches for the Poland national football team in 1978.

References

External links
 

1948 births
2017 deaths
Polish footballers
Poland international footballers
Place of birth missing
Association footballers not categorized by position